This is a list of areas in the London Borough of Brent.

Postcode areas in Brent are HA, NW, and W.

Neighbourhoods

Electoral wards
Brent is divided into 21 Electoral Wards, some which share a name with the areas above: Alperton, Barnhill, Brondesbury Park, Dollis Hill, Dudden Hill, Fryent, Harlesden, Kensal Green, Kenton, Kilburn, Mapesbury, Northwick Park, Preston, Queen's Park, Queensbury, Stonebridge, Sudbury, Tokyngton, Welsh Harp, Wembley Central, Willesden Green, Church Road.

Lists of places in London